2sTV is the second television channel of Senegal.

It is owned 100% by El hadji Ibrahima Ndiaye, the administrator of the channel.

Beginnings 
In 2003, the first programmes were shown on the UHF23 channel. The station was at first a partnership between the historic television channel of Senegal, Radiodiffusion Télévision Sénégalaise (RTS) and a private group, "Origine SA". The channel was named: RTS2S.

Development 
The channel showed its independence with a new name: 2sTV. The programmes it showed were more focused on culture, freer, and newer.

Programmes 
Mainly, cultural programmes, interviews with local music and other artistic stars, and talkshows. These programmes are mainly in Wolof. The interviews are translated into French, as Senegal is Francophone. However, sometimes a show in Pulaar is included on the schedules. "Yella" - is presented every Sunday at 14h00 (local time) by the Halpulaar personality Farba Sally Seck. It deals with the history of Fouta (a region in the north-east of Senegal) and of the Fulas, accompanied by a "bammbaado" (a "hoddu" or "xalam" player) and a famous personality from Boundou (south-east of Senegal) who, with his two sons, sings the "yeela" songs, on the theme, or the local history.

Series 
vaihedy 
Tout le monde déteste Chris
Lost
La Belle Mère
tourbillon de passion
Show Tout Chaud 
''vaihedy

Organisation 
In March 2007, Aziz Samb left RTS after 14 years of service to join the group as an external contractor.

Headquarters 
The channel is based in the business quarter close to the Banque Centrale des États de l’Afrique de l’Ouest (BCEAO) in the centre of Dakar.

See also

 Radiodiffusion Télévision Sénégalaise
 RTS1
 Canal France International
 Media of Senegal

References 

Television stations in Senegal
Television channels and stations established in 2003